Stand Up For Your Rice! is a 2007 album by Money Mark released in Japan only.

Track listing 
 "Turkey Pot Pie"
 "You And I Pretend"
 "Song With Gas"
 "Percolate"
 "The Monte Cristo"
 "Silly Putty"
 "Upon Closer Inspection"
 "Happy Life"
 "Notorious Fig"
 "Remy's Night"
 "Sprout Patrol"
 "The Vegan Menace"
 "Nanobot Highway"
 "Double-M Ten"

Personnel 
Recorded and edited By Nick Pavey, mixed by Yonatan Elkayam and mastered by Dave Cooley.

References 
 Rush! Productions
 Stand Up For Your Rice! at HMV Japan
 Stand Up For Your Rice! at Beastiemania.com

External links 
 discogs.com

2007 albums
Money Mark albums